Emil Frend Öfors (born 13 September 1994) is a Swedish handball player for IFK Kristianstad and the Swedish national team.

He participated at the 2017 World Men's Handball Championship.

References

1994 births
Living people
Handball players from Stockholm
Swedish male handball players

Handball-Bundesliga players
Swedish expatriate sportspeople in Germany
THW Kiel players
HSG Wetzlar players
IFK Kristianstad players